Thalassothemis marchali is a species of dragonfly in the family Libellulidae. It is endemic to Mauritius.  Its natural habitats are subtropical or tropical moist montane forests and rivers. It is threatened by habitat loss. It is the only species in its genus.

References

Endemic fauna of Mauritius
Libellulidae
Insects described in 1842
Taxa named by Jules Pierre Rambur
Taxonomy articles created by Polbot